The Men's artistic individual all-around competition Gymnastics at the 2017 Summer Universiade in Taipei was held on 22 August at the Taipei Nangang Exhibition Center, Hall 1, 4F.

Schedule 
All times are Taiwan Standard Time (UTC+08:00)

Results

References 

 Results

External links 
 Official website

Men's artistic individual all-around